Jens Rud Nielsen (22 September 1894 – 20 April 1979) was born in Copenhagen and was a physicist at the University of Oklahoma. He immigrated to the United States in 1922. He was awarded the Guggenheim Fellowship in 1931.

Scientific accomplishments 
Nielsen entered the University of Copenhagen in the fall semester of 1913, where world-renowned physicist Niels Bohr was a professor. Nielsen attended many of Bohr's lectures during his time at Copenhagen. Nielsen resigned from the University of Copenhagen in 1922 and was employed at the University of Oklahoma in 1924. Eventually, in 1931, Nielsen went back to Copenhagen and spent two years at Bohr's Institute.

At the University of Oklahoma he was told to create a research program for the University's physics program. Due to lack of space and financial problems, Nielsen was forced to use heat tunnels and old washrooms in the place of laboratories. During his time at the University of Oklahoma, Nielsen supervised half of the physics PH.D. students. Eventually, Nielsen's research program became the center of the creation of the University of Oklahoma National Research Institute.

In 1943, while he was still working for the University of Oklahoma, Nielsen began building a large Raman infrared spectrometer for the Naval Research Laboratory. It was completed several years later, and for a time was known as the most powerful prism infrared spectrometer. Nielsen stayed in contact with the Naval Research Laboratory for several years after this project. Together they investigated the vibrational spectra of fluorocarbons and fluorinated hydrocarbons.

Awards and honors 
On November 16, 1971 Nielsen was inducted into the Oklahoma Hall of Fame. George Lynn Cross, the University of Oklahoma president, referred to him as "Oklahoma's most distinguished scientist." After his retirement from the University of Oklahoma in 1965 the Physics and Astronomy department building was named Nielsen Hall in his honor. He was awarded the Guggenheim Fellowship in 1931. And in 1922-1923 he was awarded the American-Scandinavian fellowship from The American-Scandinavian Foundation. Nielsen was the editor of the Journal of the Optical Society of America.

References 

1894 births
1979 deaths
20th-century American physicists
University of Oklahoma faculty
Danish emigrants to the United States